Marian Patalinghug, better known as Donna Villa, was a Filipina film producer and actress. 

Villa started her career in the entertainment industry as an actress. One of her early acts was the 1977 film Namangka sa Dalawang Ilog which starred Romeo Vasquez, Gloria Romero and Alma Moreno.

Hailing from Lapu-Lapu City, Donna Villa is the wife of film director Carlo J. Caparas with whom she had a son and a daughter. Donna Villa and Caparas were collectively known as the "Golden Couple" and was credited for the "Massacre Era" of Philippine film industry in the early 1990s. With Caparas, she produced the 1990s films The Vizconde Massacre, The Myrna Diones Story (Lord, Have Mercy), and The Lilian Velez Story: Till Death Do Us Part. One of her last films was the 2017 feature Kamandag ng Droga which was influenced from President Rodrigo Duterte's war on drugs.

Donna Villa died at the age of 57 on January 17, 2017 at the University of Santo Tomas Hospital in Manila. Initial reports state that she died from cancer, although her exact cause of death was undisclosed by her family.

References

Filipino film producers
2017 deaths
Filipino film actresses